Fernando Silva (born 10 January 1952) is a Portuguese sprinter. He competed in the men's 400 metres at the 1972 Summer Olympics.

References

1952 births
Living people
Athletes (track and field) at the 1972 Summer Olympics
Portuguese male sprinters
Olympic athletes of Portugal
Place of birth missing (living people)